Ruth Wedgwood (born 1949) is an American lawyer and university professor who holds the Edward B. Burling Chair in International Law and Diplomacy at the School of Advanced International Studies, Johns Hopkins University, in Washington, D.C.

Family origins 
Ruth Wedgwood is the daughter of labor lawyer Morris P. Glushien, former general counsel of the International Ladies Garment Workers Union who served as a World War II cryptanalyst, and Anne Sorelle Williams, an artist. In 1982 she married her Harvard classmate, National Institutes of Health immunologist Josiah F. Wedgwood, a member of the Wedgwood pottery family.

Current career 
She has expertise in the fields of international law, international criminal law, the law of armed conflict, and human rights law.

In 2002, Wedgwood was elected to serve as the U.S. member of the United Nations Human Rights Committee. She currently serves as a member of the board of directors of Freedom House a nonpartisan NGO that promotes human rights and democracy world-wide. She was the first female law clerk to renowned federal judge Henry J. Friendly on the U.S. Court of Appeals for the Second Circuit
 and also served as law clerk to Justice Harry Blackmun on the U.S. Supreme Court. Wedgwood received her undergraduate degree at Harvard where she graduated magna cum laude, and her legal education at Yale Law School, where she was executive editor of the Yale Law Journal. She is currently a member of the Whitney R. Harris World Law Institute's International Council.

See also 
 List of law clerks of the Supreme Court of the United States (Seat 2)

References

External links
 Lectures by Ruth Wedgwood
 June 12, 2006 Debate at the Carnegie Council on Ethics in International Affairs, entitled The United Nations: Still Relevant After All These Years?
 

American legal scholars
International law scholars
1949 births
Living people
Naval War College faculty
Johns Hopkins University faculty
Harvard University alumni
Yale Law School alumni
Law clerks of the Supreme Court of the United States
United Nations Human Rights Committee members
Darwin–Wedgwood family
American women lawyers
American officials of the United Nations
American women legal scholars
Charles H. Stockton Professors of International Law
American women academics
21st-century American women
Presidents of the International Law Association